Neobythites is a genus of cusk-eels.

Species
There are currently 52 recognized species in this genus:
 Neobythites alcocki J. G. Nielsen, 2002
 Neobythites analis Barnard, 1927 (Black-edged cusk-eel)
 Neobythites andamanensis J. G. Nielsen, 2002
 Neobythites australiensis J. G. Nielsen, 2002 (Australian cusk)
 Neobythites bimaculatus J. G. Nielsen, 1997 (Twospot cusk)
 Neobythites bimarginatus Fourmanoir & Rivaton, 1979
 Neobythites braziliensis J. G. Nielsen, 1999
 Neobythites crosnieri J. G. Nielsen, 1995
 Neobythites elongatus J. G. Nielsen & Retzer, 1994
 Neobythites fasciatus H. M. Smith & Radcliffe, 1913
 Neobythites fijiensis J. G. Nielsen, 2002
 Neobythites franzi J. G. Nielsen, 2002 (Franz's cusk)
 Neobythites gilli Goode & T. H. Bean, 1885 (Twospot brotula)
 Neobythites javaensis J. G. Nielsen, 2002
 Neobythites kenyaensis J. G. Nielsen, 1995
 Neobythites longipes H. M. Smith & Radcliffe, 1913 (Longray cusk)
 Neobythites longispinis J. G. Nielsen, 2002
 Neobythites longiventralis J. G. Nielsen, 1997
 Neobythites machidai Ohashi, J. G. Nielsen & Yabe, 2012
 Neobythites macrocelli J. G. Nielsen, 2002
 Neobythites macrops Günther, 1887 (Spotfin cusk)
 Neobythites malayanus M. C. W. Weber, 1913
 Neobythites malhaensis J. G. Nielsen, 1995
 Neobythites marginatus Goode & T. H. Bean, 1886 (Stripefin brotula)
 Neobythites marianaensis J. G. Nielsen, 2002
 Neobythites marquesaensis J. G. Nielsen, 2002
 Neobythites meteori J. G. Nielsen, 1995
 Neobythites monocellatus J. G. Nielsen, 1999
 Neobythites multidigitatus J. G. Nielsen, 1999
 Neobythites multiocellatus J. G. Nielsen, Uiblein & Mincarone, 2009
 Neobythites multistriatus J. G. Nielsen & Quéro, 1991
 Neobythites musorstomi J. G. Nielsen, 2002
 Neobythites natalensis J. G. Nielsen, 1995
 Neobythites neocaledoniensis J. G. Nielsen, 1997
 Neobythites nigriventris J. G. Nielsen, 2002 (Blackbelly cusk)
 Neobythites ocellatus Günther, 1887
 Neobythites pallidus J. G. Nielsen, 1997 (Pale cusk)
 Neobythites purus H. M. Smith & Radcliffe, 1913 (Pure cusk)
 Neobythites sereti J. G. Nielsen, 2002
 Neobythites sinensis J. G. Nielsen, 2002
 Neobythites sivicola (D. S. Jordan & Snyder, 1901)
 Neobythites soelae J. G. Nielsen, 2002 (Soela cusk)
 Neobythites somaliaensis J. G. Nielsen, 1995
 Neobythites steatiticus Alcock, 1894
 Neobythites stefanovi J. G. Nielsen & Uiblein, 1993
 Neobythites stelliferoides C. H. Gilbert, 1890 (Thread brotula)
 Neobythites stigmosus Machida, 1984
 Neobythites trifilis Kotthaus, 1979
 Neobythites unicolor J. G. Nielsen & Retzer, 1994
 Neobythites unimaculatus H. M. Smith & Radcliffe, 1913 (Onespot cusk)
 Neobythites vityazi J. G. Nielsen, 1995
 Neobythites zonatus J. G. Nielsen, 1997

References

Ophidiidae